The Jonesboro–Paragould Combined Statistical Area is made up of three counties in northeastern Arkansas. The CSA consists of the Jonesboro Metropolitan Statistical Area and the Paragould Micropolitan Statistical Area. As of the 2010 census, the CSA had a population of 163,116.

Counties

 Craighead
 Greene
 Poinsett

Cities and towns

Places with more than 60,000 inhabitants
 Jonesboro (Principal city) Pop: 67,263

Places with more than 20,000 inhabitants
 Paragould (Principal city) Pop: 26,113

Places with 1,000 to 10,000 inhabitants
 Trumann Pop: 7,243
 Marked Tree Pop: 2,566
 Harrisburg Pop: 2,288
 Bono Pop: 2,131
 Lake City Pop: 2,082
 Lepanto Pop: 1,893
 Bay Pop: 1,801
 Brookland Pop: 1,642
 Monette Pop: 1,501
 Caraway Pop: 1,279
 Marmaduke Pop: 1,111

Places with less than 1,000 inhabitants
 Oak Grove Heights Pop: 889
 Tyronza Pop: 762
 Weiner Pop: 716
 Lafe Pop: 458
 Cash Pop: 342
 Fisher Pop: 273
 Black Oak Pop: 262
 Delaplaine Pop: 116
 Egypt Pop: 112
 Waldenburg Pop: 61

Unincorporated places

Demographics
As of the census of 2000, there were 145,093 people, 57,077 households, and 40,029 families residing within the CSA. The racial makeup of the CSA was 91.68% White, 5.70% African American, 0.34% Native American, 0.41% Asian, 0.02% Pacific Islander, 0.78% from other races, and 1.08% from two or more races. Hispanic or Latino of any race were 1.75% of the population.

The median income for a household in the CSA was $29,937, and the median income for a family was $36,754. Males had a median income of $28,178 versus $20,228 for females. The per capita income for the CSA was $15,527.

See also
 Arkansas metropolitan areas

References

Jonesboro metropolitan area
Metropolitan areas of Arkansas
Combined statistical areas of the United States